Anthony "Tony" I. Wasserman is an American computer scientist. He is a member of the board of directors of the Open Source Initiative, a professor of the Practice in Software Management at Carnegie Mellon Silicon Valley, and the executive director of the CMU Center for Open Source Investigation.

As a special faculty member at Carnegie Mellon University, Wasserman teaches classes in cloud computing, open source software, and software product definition.  He is a frequent speaker at Open Source conferences around the world including the Open World Forum. He was the general chair of the tenth international conference on Open Source systems, OSS2014, in Costa Rica.

After working as a professor at the University of California, San Francisco and as a lecturer at the University of California, Berkeley, Wasserman founded and was CEO of Interactive Development Environments, a computer-aided software engineering company that became a predecessor of Atego, from  1983 to 1993. He then became vice president of Bluestone Software before its acquisition by Hewlett Packard.

In 1996 he was elected as a fellow of the IEEE "for contributions to software engineering, including the development of computer-aided software engineering (CASE) tools". In the same year he also became a fellow of the Association for Computing Machinery "for technical and professional contributions to the field of software engineering".

References 

Year of birth missing (living people)
Living people
American computer scientists
Carnegie Mellon University faculty
University of California, Berkeley faculty
Fellows of the Association for Computing Machinery
Fellow Members of the IEEE
Members of the Open Source Initiative board of directors
University of California, San Francisco faculty